John Doyle (born 31 July 1977) is a former professional rugby league footballer who played for the North Queensland Cowboys and the Sydney Roosters in the NRL.

Background
Born in Rockhampton, Queensland. Doyle was educated at North Rockhampton State High School.

John played junior rugby league for Yeppoon Seagulls.

Playing career
After retiring from football to live in Queensland, he signed a 1-year deal at the end of the 2005 season after Ricky Stuart contacted him to play with the Sydney Roosters in the National Rugby League. He signed for another year with the Sydney Roosters, however in late February (2007) during training camp he had decided to retire due to ongoing knee problems.

Played three games for Queensland (scored 1 try for 4 points)

Played 74 first grade games (scored 10 tries and kicked 6 goals for 52 points)

Career highlights
Rep honours: 3 games Qld 2001–02
Junior clubs: Yeppoon Seagulls
FG debut: North Queensland v Hunter Mariners, Breakers Stadium, 22 March 1997 (Rd 4)

References

External links
 Player stats – John Doyle
 Queensland Rugby League

1977 births
Living people
Australian rugby league players
Indigenous Australian rugby league players
North Queensland Cowboys players
Queensland Rugby League State of Origin players
Rugby league hookers
Rugby league players from Rockhampton, Queensland
Sydney Roosters players